Bruce Dowie (born December 9, 1962) is a Canadian former professional ice hockey goaltender. He played 2 games in the National Hockey League (NHL) for the Toronto Maple Leafs during the 1983–84 season. The rest of his career, which lasted from 1983 to 1987, was spent in the minor leagues. As a youth, he played in the 1975 Quebec International Pee-Wee Hockey Tournament with a minor ice hockey team from Oakville, Ontario.

Career statistics

Regular season and playoffs

References

External links
 

1962 births
Living people
Canadian ice hockey goaltenders
Ice hockey people from Ontario
Muskegon Mohawks players
Newmarket Saints players
St. Catharines Saints players
Sportspeople from Oakville, Ontario
Toledo Goaldiggers players
Toronto Maple Leafs players
Toronto Marlboros players
Undrafted National Hockey League players